Rafael Yiangoudakis  (born August 3, 1990 in Limassol) is a Cypriot football midfielder.

Club career
In 2008, Rafael Yiangoudakis made his debut with the Apollon Limassol first team and had 3 appearances. In the season 2009-2010, he had 15 appearances with APEP FC who played very well the position of left winger and left back. At the age of 17 he had appearances with the youth team of Allemania Aachen FC.
Rafael Yiangoudakis is also a member of the Cyprus U-21 national team and counts more than 10 appearances.

External links
 CFA Profile
 

1990 births
Living people
Cypriot footballers
Cyprus under-21 international footballers
Association football forwards
Apollon Limassol FC players
APEP FC players
Nea Salamis Famagusta FC players
Nikos & Sokratis Erimis FC players
Enosis Neon Parekklisia FC players
Ethnikos Achna FC players
Pafos FC players
Kallithea F.C. players
Ermis Aradippou FC players
Aris Limassol FC players
Cypriot First Division players
Cypriot Second Division players
Football League (Greece) players
Expatriate footballers in Greece
Cypriot expatriate footballers
Cypriot expatriate sportspeople in Greece
Sportspeople from Limassol